Dragi can be:

 Drągi, a village in north-eastern Poland
 Dragi Kotsev, Macedonian footballer
 Dragi Setinov, a retired Macedonian football player
 Dragi Jovanović, Serbian politician and Axis collaborator
 Moj Dragi, the first single by Serbian singer Anabela Đogani
 Črni Potok pri Dragi, a small settlement on the left bank of the river Čabranka in southern Slovenia
 Srednja vas pri Dragi, a village to the southeast of Draga in the Loški Potok municipality in southern Slovenia 
 Dragi Kanatlarovski, a retired Yugoslav and Macedonian football player

Variations 
 Draga, Dragan, Drăgan, Dragana, Dragas
 Dragić, Dragica, Dragiša, Dragivoje
 Drago, Dragoş, Dragoljub, Dragomir, Dragoslav, Dragović
 Draž, Draza, Dražen, Drážovce, Dragutin
 Dražíč, Dražica, Dražice, Dražičky